An ecovillage  is a traditional or intentional community with the goal of becoming more socially, culturally, economically, and/or ecologically sustainable. An ecovillage strives to produce the least possible negative impact on the natural environment through intentional physical design and resident behavior choices.  It is consciously designed through locally owned, participatory processes to regenerate and restore its social and natural environments. Most range from a population of 50 to 250 individuals, although some are smaller, and traditional ecovillages are often much larger. Larger ecovillages often exist as networks of smaller sub-communities. Some ecovillages have grown through like-minded individuals, families, or other small groups—who are not members, at least at the outset—settling on the ecovillage's periphery and participating de facto in the community.

Ecovillagers are united by shared ecological, social-economic and cultural-spiritual values.  Concretely, ecovillagers seek alternatives to ecologically destructive electrical, water, transportation, and waste-treatment systems, as well as the larger social systems that mirror and support them.  Many see the breakdown of traditional forms of community, wasteful consumerist lifestyles, the destruction of natural habitat, urban sprawl, factory farming, and over-reliance on fossil fuels as trends that must be changed to avert ecological disaster and create richer and more fulfilling ways of life.

Ecovillages offer small-scale communities with minimal ecological impact or regenerative impacts as an alternative.  However, such communities often cooperate with peer villages in networks of their own (see Global Ecovillage Network (GEN) for an example).  This model of collective action is similar to that of Ten Thousand Villages, which supports the fair trade of goods worldwide.

Definition
Multiple sources define ecovillages as a subtype of intentional communities focussing on sustainability. More pronounced definitions are listed here:

In Joubert's view, ecovillages are seen as an ongoing process, rather than a particular outcome. They often start off with a focus on one of the four dimensions of sustainability, e.g. ecology, but evolve into holistic models for restoration. In this view, aiming for sustainability is not enough; it is vital to restore and regenerate the fabric of life and across all four dimensions of sustainability: social, environmental, economic and cultural.

Ecovillages have developed in recent years as technology has improved, so they have more sophisticated structures as noted by Baydoun, M. 2013.

Generally, the ecovillage concept is not tied to specific sectarian (religious, political, corporate) organizations or belief systems not directly related to environmentalism, such as monasteries, cults, or communes.

History
The modern-day desire for community was notably characterized by the communal "back to the land" movement of the 1960s and 1970s through communities such as the earliest example that still survives, the Miccosukee Land Co-op co-founded in May 1973 by James Clement van Pelt in Tallahassee, Florida. In the same decades, the imperative for alternatives to radically inefficient energy-use patterns, in particular automobile-enabled suburban sprawl, was brought into focus by recurrent energy crises. The term "eco-village" was introduced by Georgia Tech Professor George Ramsey in a 1978 address, "Passive Energy Applications for the Built Environment", to the First World Energy Conference of the Association of Energy Engineers, to describe small-scale, car-free, close-in developments, including suburban infill, arguing that "the great energy waste in the United States is not in its technology; it is in its lifestyle and concept of living." Ramsey's article includes a sketch for a "self-sufficient pedestrian solar village" by one of his students that looks very similar to eco-villages today.

The movement became more focused and organized in the cohousing and related alternative-community movements of the mid-1980s. Then, in 1991, Robert Gilman and Diane Gilman co-authored a germinal study called "Ecovillages and Sustainable Communities" for Gaia Trust, in which the ecological and communitarian themes were brought together.

The first Eco-Village in North America began its first stages in 1990. Earthaven Eco-Village in Black Mountain, NC was the first community called an Eco-Village and was designed using permaculture (holistic) principles. The first residents moved onto the vacant land in 1993. As of 2019 Earthaven Eco-Village has over 70 families living off the grid on 368 acres of land. 

The ecovillage movement began to coalesce at the annual autumn conference of Findhorn, in Scotland, in 1995. The conference was called: "Ecovillages and Sustainable Communities", and conference organizers turned away hundreds of applicants. According to Ross Jackson, "somehow they had struck a chord that resonated far and wide. The word 'ecovillage'... thus became part of the language of the Cultural Creatives." After that conference, many intentional communities, including Findhorn, began calling themselves "ecovillages", giving birth to a new movement. The Global Ecovillage Network, formed by a group of about 25 people from various countries who had attended the Findhorn conference, crystallized the event by linking hundreds of small projects from around the world, that had similar goals but had formerly operated without knowledge of each other. Gaia Trust of Denmark agreed to fund the network for its first five years. Today, there are self-identified ecovillages in over 70 countries on six continents.

Since the 1995 conference, a number of the early members of the Global Ecovillage Network have tried other approaches to ecovillage building in an attempt to build settlements that would be attractive to mainstream culture in order to make sustainable development more generally accepted. One of these with some degree of success is Living Villages and The Wintles where eco-houses are arranged so that social connectivity is maximised and residents have shared food growing areas, woodlands, and animal husbandry for greater sustainability.

The principles on which ecovillages rely can be applied to urban and rural settings, as well as to developing and developed countries. Advocates seek a sustainable lifestyle (for example, of voluntary simplicity) for inhabitants with a minimum of trade outside the local area, or ecoregion. Many advocates also seek independence from existing infrastructures, although others, particularly in more urban settings, pursue more integration with existing infrastructure. Rural ecovillages are usually based on organic farming, permaculture and other approaches which promote ecosystem function and biodiversity.  Ecovillages, whether urban or rural, tend to integrate community and ecological values within a principle-based approach to sustainability, such as permaculture design.

Johnathan Dawson, former president of the Global Ecovillage Network, describes five ecovillage principles in his 2006 book Ecovillages: New Frontiers for Sustainability:
 They are not government-sponsored projects, but grassroots initiatives.
 Their residents value and practice community living.
 Their residents are not overly dependent on government, corporate, or other centralized sources for water, food, shelter, power, and other basic necessities. Rather, they attempt to provide these resources themselves.
 Their residents have a strong sense of shared values, often characterized in spiritual terms.
 They often serve as research and demonstration sites, offering educational experiences for others.

Governance
Effective governance is important within ecovillages. It provides a model to implement and promote sustainable lifestyles (Cunningham and Wearing, 2013). While the first generation of ecovillagers tended to adopt consensus decision-making as a governance method, some difficulties with consensus as an everyday decision-making method emerged: it can be extremely time-intensive, and decisions too often could be blocked by a few intransigent members. More recently many ecovillages have moved toward sociocracy and related alternative decision-making methods.

In addition, ecovillages look for alternative forms of government, with an emphasis on deeper connections with ecology than economics.

See also

References

Kellogg, W. Keating, W. (2011), "Cleveland's Ecovillage: green and affordable housing through a network alliance", Housing Policy Debate, 21 (1), pp. 69–91

Cunningham, Paul A. and Wearing, Stephen L.(2013).The Politics of Consensus: An Exploration of the Cloughjordan Ecovillage, Ireland.[electronic version]. Cosmopolitan Civil Societies. 5(2) pp. 1–28

Further reading
Books
Christian, D.  2003.  Creating a Life Together: Practical Tools to Grow Ecovillages and Intentional Communities  New Society Publishers.  
 Dawson, Jonathan (2006) Ecovillages: Angelica Buenaventura for Sustainability. Green Books. 
Hill, R. and Dunbar, R. 2002. "Social Network Size in Humans."  Human Nature, Vol. 14, No. 1, pp. 53–72.
Jackson, H. and Svensson, K. 2002.  Ecovillage Living: Restoring the Earth and Her People.  Green Books.  
Walker, Liz. 2005 EcoVillage at Ithaca: Pioneering a Sustainable Culture. New Society Publishers 
Sunarti, Euis (eds.) 2009. Model of Ecovillage Development: Development of Rural Areas in Order To Improve Quality of Life for Rural Residents, Indonesia. 
Joubert, Kosha and Dregger, Leila 2015.  Ecovillage: 1001 ways to heal the planet . Triarchy Press.  
 Christian, Diana L. (ed.) The Ecovillage Movement Today. Ecovillage Newsletter.
 Gilman, Robert (ed.) Living Together: Sustainable Community Development. In Context.
 Genovese, Paolo Vincenzo (2019), Being Light on the Earth. Eco-Village Policy and Practice for a Sustainable World, Libria, Melfi, Vol. I., ISDN 978-88-6764-187-1. Also in eBook.
 Frederica Miller, Ed. (2018) Ecovillages Around the World: 20 Regenerative Designs for Sustainable Communities  - Rochester, Vermont, Findhorn Press,

External links

Global Ecovillage Network 
eurotopia - Living in Community: European Directory of Communities and Ecovillages
Fellowship for Intentional Community: Ecovillage Directory 
Wanderer's End Tactical & Practical Ecovillage Network of the Americas
Vietnamese Eco Village in Saigon

 
Urban studies and planning terminology
Environmental design
Simple living